Tricholoma apium is a mushroom of the agaric genus Tricholoma that is found in Europe. It is classified as vulnerable in the IUCN Red List of Threatened Species.

See also
List of North American Tricholoma
List of Tricholoma species

References

apium
Fungi described in 1925
Fungi of Europe
Fungi of North America